Wilson Raimundo Júnior (born 27 October 1976), known as Wilson Júnior, is a Brazilian football manager and former player who played as a goalkeeper. He is the current manager of Santo André.

Biography
In December 2003 he left for União Barbarense. He also played for Steaua București In mid-2004 he left for Atlético Sorocaba. Wilson re-joined Barbarense in April 2005.

Wilson Júnior left for Portuguese side Naval in August 2005. In 2007–08 Portuguese Liga, he was the first choice and competed with Pedro Taborda.

In 2008–09 season he left for Inter Baku, he was the backup of Svilen Simeonov.

Career statistics

1Unknown appearances in 1999 Campeonato Paulista.
2Unknown appearances in 2003 Campeonato Paulista Série A2.
3Unknown appearances in 2004 Campeonato Paulista.
4Unknown appearances in 2004 Copa FPF.
5Unknown appearances in 2005 Campeonato Paulista.
6appearances in 2009 Commonwealth of Independent States Cup.

References

External links 
 Portuguese Liga Profile 
 Profile on Inter Baku's Official Site 
 
 
 Futpedia Profile 
 CBF 

People from São Bernardo do Campo
1976 births
Living people
Brazilian footballers
Brazilian football managers
Brazilian expatriate footballers
Association football goalkeepers
Expatriate footballers in Portugal
Expatriate footballers in Azerbaijan
Brazilian expatriate sportspeople in Portugal
Brazilian expatriate sportspeople in Azerbaijan
Campeonato Brasileiro Série A players
Campeonato Brasileiro Série B players
Primeira Liga players
Sport Club Corinthians Paulista players
Club Athletico Paranaense players
Associação Atlética Portuguesa (Santos) players
Botafogo de Futebol e Regatas players
Rio Branco Esporte Clube players
Ferro Carril Oeste footballers
Ceará Sporting Club players
Botafogo Futebol Clube (SP) players
São José Esporte Clube players
União Agrícola Barbarense Futebol Clube players
Clube Atlético Sorocaba players
Associação Naval 1º de Maio players
Shamakhi FK players
São Bernardo Futebol Clube players
Boa Esporte Clube players
ABC Futebol Clube players
Clube Atlético Bragantino players
Sociedade Esportiva Matonense players
Sociedade Esportiva Matonense managers
São Bernardo Futebol Clube managers
Rio Preto Esporte Clube managers
Atlético Monte Azul managers
Clube Atlético Juventus managers
Associação Desportiva São Caetano managers
Esporte Clube Santo André managers
Footballers from São Paulo (state)